Asseclamyia is a genus of flies in the family Tachinidae.

Species
Asseclamyia sphenofrons Reinhard, 1956

Distribution
United States.

References

Diptera of North America
Exoristinae
Tachinidae genera
Monotypic Brachycera genera